Khazar Agaali oglu Isayev  (born 4 January 1963, in Agdash, Azerbaijan) is a former Soviet wrestler, world and European champion in freestyle wrestling. He is of Azerbaijani descent.

References

1963 births
Living people
Soviet male sport wrestlers
Azerbaijani male sport wrestlers
People from Agdash District
World Wrestling Championships medalists
European Wrestling Championships medalists
World Wrestling Champions